Ljiljana Aranđelović (Serbian Cyrillic: Љиљана Аранђеловић) (born February 16, 1963) is a Serbian politician and former presidential candidate in the 2004 Serbian presidential election.

She is a journalist and she has been an editor of many newspapers and RTV Ćuprija.

Her party, United Serbia, was created from the Party of Serbian Unity. She is its deputy president.

References

1963 births
Living people
United Serbia politicians
Candidates for President of Serbia
21st-century Serbian women politicians
21st-century Serbian politicians
Serbian women journalists
Women newspaper editors
Serbian newspaper editors